Whitman House may refer to:

Edward Fenns Whitman House, Boaz, Alabama, listed on the National Register of Historic Places (NRHP) in Marshall County
Whitman-Cobb House, New Market, Alabama, NRHP-listed in Madison County
Merle Whitman Tourist Cabin, Ozark, Arkansas, NRHP-listed in Franklin County
Stanley-Whitman House, Farmington, Connecticut, NRHP-listed in Hartford County
 Whitman House (West Hartford, Connecticut), NRHP-listed in Hartford County
Whitman-Anderson House, Ringgold, Georgia, NRHP-listed in Catoosa County
Josiah B. Whitman House, Barnstable, Massachusetts, NRHP-listed in Barnstable County
John S. Whitman House, Midland, Michigan, NRHP-listed in Midland County
George Whitman House, Camden, New Jersey, NRHP-listed in Camden County
Walt Whitman House, Camden, New Jersey, NRHP-listed in Camden County
Joseph Whitman House, West Hills, New York, NRHP-listed in Suffolk County
Walt Whitman House, West Hills, New York, NRHP-listed in Suffolk County
Whitman-Place House, West Hills, New York, NRHP-listed in Suffolk County
Winsor-Swan-Whitman Farm, Providence, Rhode Island, NRHP-listed
Whitman-Belden House, Rochester, Wisconsin, NRHP-listed in Racine County